The following is a list of episodes for the third arc of Toei Animation's Digimon Fusion series, known in Japan as . The story follows Taiki Kudō and his united friends attempting to protect both worlds from Quartzmon. The opening theme is "Stand Up" by Twill. The series also features original music by Kousuke Yamashita, as well as various insert songs sung by Kōji Wada and Psychic Lover. This season did not receive a localized English dub.

Episode list

References

General

External links
 TV Asahi's official The Boy Hunters Who Leapt Through Time website
 Toei Animation's official Digimon Xros Wars: The Boy Hunters Who Leapt Through Time website

2011 Japanese television seasons
2012 Japanese television seasons
Fusion (season 3)